Cibadak Station (CBD) is a class III railway station located in Cibadak, Cibadak, Sukabumi Regency. The station, which is located at an altitude of +380 meters, is included in the Operation Area I Jakarta.

Services 
The following is a list of train services at the Cibadak Station.

Passenger services
 Mixed class
 Pangrango, towards  and towards  (executive-economy)

References

External links

Sukabumi Regency
Railway stations in West Java
Railway stations opened in 1882